HK Tauri is a young binary star system in the constellation of Taurus about 434 light-years away, belonging to the Taurus Molecular Cloud.

System 

Properties 
Both members of the binary are medium-mass objects still contracting towards the main sequence and accreting mass. Their ages are probably young (below 10 million years) but cannot be estimated with any accuracy because both stars are strongly obscured by the protoplanetary disks.

Protoplanetary system
The companion star HK Tauri B is surrounded by a protoplanetary disk visible nearly edge-on. It contains water and carbon dioxide ices, along with gaseous carbon monoxide. The disk is unusually flat, with an aspect ratio of 4.4, while most young stars host disks with aspect ratios of about 3. The disk also contain relatively few large dust particles compared to fine dust, with a size distribution power-law slope of 4.2. The disk mass is relatively small, not larger than 0.0005, and dust distribution is asymmetric. The plane of the disk is not aligned with the orbit of the binary.

Multiple planets embedded in the disk of HK Tauri B have been suspected since 1993, although none were detected by 2020.

References 

Binary stars
T Tauri stars
Circumstellar disks
Taurus (constellation)
J04315056+2424180
Tauri, HK